Ableh or Abeleh may refer to:
 Ableh-ye Olya, Khuzestan Province
 Ableh-ye Sofla, Khuzestan Province
 Ableh, Kohgiluyeh and Boyer-Ahmad